Carlino may refer to:

People
Carlino (surname), Italian surname

Toponyms
Carlino, comune (municipality) in the Province of Udine in the Italian region Friuli-Venezia Giulia

Other
Il Resto del Carlino, Italian newspaper based in Bologna

See also

Carlin (disambiguation)
Carlina (name)
Carling (disambiguation)
Carlini (disambiguation)
Carlinos
Carlito (disambiguation)